Halflife is a BBC Books original novel written by Mark Michalowski and based on the long-running British science fiction television series Doctor Who. It features the Eighth Doctor, Fitz and Trix.

Plot

Having landed on the planet of Espero, the Doctor and Fitz leave Trix in the TARDIS whilst they investigate a distress signal. As she grows bored, Trix decides to leave, but is surprised to find an amnesiac Fitz lying unconscious outside the TARDIS. They find themselves in the path of a wavefront of grey goo, and Fitz surprises Trix by being quite keen to investigate the mystery.

The Doctor, meanwhile, has been befriended by Calamee, a member of the planet's ruling family. The amnesia he has been suffering from has grown worse, and he — like Fitz — has forgotten everything that has happened prior to the start of the novel. He is directed to the home of a mysterious off-worlder named Madam Xing, who restores his most recent memories and confirms that the memories lost (prior to The Burning) have been permanently deleted, rather than merely suppressed. The Doctor refuses to allow Xing to restore the memories by using a viroid unit, but does take the unit with him as he leaves. As he goes, he discovers that he is being observed via anachronistic technology.

Fitz and Trix head to the city, and watch as a mob of citizens attack a "night beast" — an unknown creature that has arrived on the planet. Fitz tries to prevent the attack, but is over-powered by the mob, who kill the beast. They are led to safety by a woman named Farine, but Trix wanders away when she sees a young boy watching them. The boy offers her a device that will allow her to disguise herself much more effectively, changing her entire body on a genetic level. Trix takes him up on the offer, only to find that the "device" is actually an alien symbiote named Reo, who takes complete control of her body.

Fitz is taken to the palace by Farine, who turns out to be Princess Sensimi of the ruling family. As they head to the cellars to visit a captured night beast, the TARDIS arrives and the Doctor and Calamee step out: the Doctor has been persuaded to warn the authorities about the wavefront. He explains that it is altering living beings on a genetic level, and manages to convince the others to join him in searching for the source of the wavefront.

Finding the source, the Doctor and Fitz discover that it is a crashed living spaceship called Tain, a warship from a race called the Makers who are involved in a war with a race called the Oon. Tain had removed the Doctor and Fitz's memories of finding the ship, but because of a Trojan virus in his systems he was unable to do the job properly. The Trojan created the night beasts as soldiers against Tain, but he was able to interfere in their development to make them docile. In his panic he activated the Gaian Wave, a self-defence mechanism that genetically alters the inhabitants of a planet so that they are all genetically part of the ship: its enemies will be unable to defeat it without destroying the entire planet.

Trix and Reo find them, and as Tain agrees to sacrifice himself to save the planet, Reo transfers his consciousness into the ship. Trix collapses, her body unable to look after itself without Reo's control, and Tain manages to link with her and keep her alive. But this leaves the Doctor with a dilemma: if he carries out Tain's wishes and destroys him to save the planet, Trix will die. Fitz saves the day: remembering that his current body was "remembered" (Interference: Book Two) he advises Tain to do the same. Tain separates himself from the ship in a new body, and destroys Reo's consciousness inside the ship. Tain then returns his consciousness to the ship, and cures Trix.

Continuity

 Halflife is one of the few books since the Doctor lost his memories after The Ancestor Cell to provide some justification for his failure to try to regain them. The novel suggests that it is because the Doctor is afraid that he may not like the person he turns out to be, although the later book The Gallifrey Chronicles states that this is untrue, and the Doctor implanted an imperative inside himself not to restore his memories for other reasons.
 The society of Espero is entirely non-Caucasian, with the Doctor, Fitz and Trix being the only white characters in the novel. Halflife is the only BBC produced Doctor Who novel where this is the case.
 The novel suggests that the events of Heritage and The Colony of Lies take place within the same period of history, although the dates given in Heritage directly contradict this. The Doctor Who Reference Guide suggests that the planet Heritage was using a non-standard dating system.

External links
The Cloister Library - Halflife

2004 British novels
2004 science fiction novels
Eighth Doctor Adventures
Novels by Mark Michalowski
Fiction about amnesia